Deals Direct was started by Paul Greenberg and Michael Rosenbaum in 2004 October. The business evolved out of an eBay retailing operation under the name of Auctionbrokers Australia into a full-fledged online retailer and swiftly grew to become the single largest online-only retailer in Australia. The business and website operations are managed out of a facility located Sydney's outer Western Suburbs. The business sells a range of general retail goods.

The business positions itself as a discount retailer targeting the Australian population in general.  The success of the business is based primarily on the hypothesis that selling goods online comes down to shoppers being focused bargain-hunters.

The Deals Direct website has won numerous awards including winning the number one online retailer award from Hitwise 

Smart Company listed the company in their Top 10 Online Retailers and Hitwise cited it as the online shopping site with the highest brand recall, at 14% 

Deals Direct placed their group buying website DealMe into liquidation in October 2012 leaving a debt of over $220,000.

References

External links
 Hitwise Blog, DealsDirect overtakes Amazon UK, 2005 
 Deals Direct website
 SmartCompany Article, 2007 
 Online retail best placed to weather downturn, smh.com.au

Online retailers of Australia
Companies based in Sydney